Balaghat Engineering College (BEC), is located at Rudha in Ahmedpur Tehsil in Latur district of Maharashtra state. The college was founded in 2009. The college provides both diploma and degree education. In degree education, the college provides education in Civil, Computer, Electrical, Electronics & Telecommunication  and Mechanical engineering and has 60 seats per branch. The departments received accreditation from All India Council for Technical Education (AICTE) in 2010 when they started. The college is unaided, non-antonymous and non-minority and is affiliated with the Swami Ramanand Teerth Marathwada University, Nanded. The college is co-ed in nature and also has separate hostel facilities. The college is managed by Shree Ganesh Shikshan Prasarak Mandal (SGSPM).

References

Engineering colleges in Maharashtra
Polytechnics in Latur
Educational institutions established in 2009
2009 establishments in Maharashtra